Wendy Diane Isdell (born March 30, 1975) is an American author and artist. She is best known for her young adult works, which incorporate science and math into fiction. Her most popular novel, A Gebra Named Al, was first published in 1993.

Career
Isdell dedicated much of her early life to writing. Her first notable publishing credit came at age nine, through articles in the Haydon Elementary School newsletter (the first ever by a student). Seven years later, she signed a contract for her first novel, A Gebra Named Al, with Free Spirit Publishing in Minneapolis, Minnesota. The sequel was published two years later.

Isdell was also a pioneer of the internet, having developed websites as early as November 1994. (However, the Internet Archive project has records for her original website dating back only to 1999, the older records presumably having been lost.) She was a contributor for early versions of DreamingGates.com, experimenting with javascript and css to create a rudimentary shopping cart as early as 1999.

Education
Isdell graduated summa cum laude in 1997 from Hofstra University with a B.A. in creative arts, then summa cum laude from Mary Washington University in 2004 with an M.A. in general studies. She went on to obtain a Doctorate of Divinity and Ph.D. in religion.

Personal
Isdell currently lives in Virginia, and is a supporter of gay and transsexual equality.  For health reasons, she rarely ventures out.

Bibliography 
 A Gebra Named Al (Free Spirit, 1994) 
 Using A Gebra Named Al in the Classroom (Free Spirit, 1994)
 The Chemy Called Al (Free Spirit, 19396; Lulu Press, 2006) 
 Using The Chemy Called Al in the Classroom (Free Spirit, 1996; Lulu Press, 2006)

References 

 Haydon Elementary School Newsletter. March 1984.
 Interview, Wendy Isdell. August 2012.

External links 
Official Website
Free Spirit Publishing website

Living people
1975 births
American women novelists
American young adult novelists
Women writers of young adult literature
21st-century American women